Lúcia Mendonça Previato (born 1949) is a Brazilian biologist. She was awarded the L'Oréal-UNESCO Awards for Women in Science in 2004 for her research into preventing Chagas disease.

She is married to Jose Osvaldo Previato and has two children, Anna and Peter. She graduated from St. Ursula University and earned her Doctorate at the Federal University of Rio de Janeiro in Microbiology and Immunology. She is also a recipient of the TWAS Prize in Biology.

References 

1949 births
Living people
Brazilian women academics
Academic staff of the Federal University of Rio de Janeiro
Brazilian biologists
L'Oréal-UNESCO Awards for Women in Science laureates
21st-century Brazilian women scientists
TWAS laureates